Reinhard Klabunde was a member of the Wisconsin State Assembly.

Biography
Klabunde was born on March 14, 1858, in Germany. He later moved to Milwaukee, Wisconsin.

Career
Klabunde was elected to the Assembly in 1894 and re-elected in 1896. He was a Republican.

References

German emigrants to the United States
Politicians from Milwaukee
Republican Party members of the Wisconsin State Assembly
1858 births
Year of death missing